Pseudohemihyalea is a genus of moths in the family Erebidae described by Régo Barros in 1956. While the caterpillars of most species of Pseudohemihyalea feed on broad-leaved trees (e.g. oaks, Quercus), the P. ambigua group has larvae that feed on conifers. Their forewing coloration has accordingly evolved to light-and-dark lengthwise striping, giving better camouflage among the slim needles of the host plants. In this, they seem to be convergent to certain geometer moths, such as Caripeta piniata or Sabulodes niveostriata.

Taxonomy
The genus was long included in Hemihyalea when the latter was still unresolved versus Amastus, but seems to be distinct and in fact contain more species than originally believed. The initial confusion stems partly from the fact that Régo Barros when describing the genus set the type species to be Phaegoptera rhoda, but he had actually misidentified Pseudohemihyalea schausi specimens as P. rhoda.

The additional species were usually considered a group of the genus Aemilia, but this was long realized to be awkward and possibly wrong. Since then, a variety of data has been found to suggest the red-banded aemilia ("Aemilia" ambigua) and its closest relatives correctly belong in Pseudohemihyalea. However, the genus is still in need of definite revision, as at least one species is incorrectly placed here.

Selected species
Species of Pseudohemihyalea include:

 Pseudohemihyalea ambigua (Strecker, 1878) – red-banded aemilia
 Pseudohemihyalea anapheoides (Rothschild, 1909)
 Pseudohemihyalea asignata (Reich, 1938)
 Pseudohemihyalea carmen (Schaus, 1920)
 Pseudohemihyalea carteronae (Toulgoët, 1982)
 Pseudohemihyalea carteronae (Toulgoët, 1982)
 Pseudohemihyalea celsicola (Toulgoët, 1982)
 Pseudohemihyalea daraba (Druce, 1894)
 Pseudohemihyalea debilis (Rothschild, 1916)
 Pseudohemihyalea despaignei (Toulgoët, 1982)
 Pseudohemihyalea edwardsii (Packard, 1864) – Edwards' glassy-wing
 Pseudohemihyalea euornithia Dyar, 1914
 Pseudohemihyalea fallaciosa Toulgoët, 1997
 Pseudohemihyalea hampsoni Joicey & Talbot, 1916
 Pseudohemihyalea inexpectata Toulgoët, 1999
 Pseudohemihyalea klagesi (Rothschild, 1909)
 Pseudohemihyalea labecula (Grote, 1881) – freckled glassy-wing
 Pseudohemihyalea labeculoides Toulgoët, 1995
 Pseudohemihyalea ludwigi Beutelspacher, 1984
 Pseudohemihyalea mansueta (H.Edwards, 1884)
 Pseudohemihyalea melas (Dognin, 1902)
 Pseudohemihyalea nimbipicta Dyar, 1914
 Pseudohemihyalea ochracea (Rothschild, 1909)
 Pseudohemihyalea porioni Toulgoët, 1995
 Pseudohemihyalea potosi Schmidt, 2009
 Pseudohemihyalea rhoda (Druce, 1894)
 Pseudohemihyalea schausi (Rothschild, 1935)
 Pseudohemihyalea sonorosa Schmidt, 2009
 Pseudohemihyalea splendens Barnes & McDunnough, 1910
 Pseudohemihyalea syracosia(Druce, 1889)
 Pseudohemihyalea testacea (Rothschild, 1909)
 Pseudohemihyalea utica (Druce, 1897)

Footnotes

References

  (2009): Revision of the "Aemilia" ambigua (Strecker) species-group (Noctuidae, Arctiinae). ZooKeys 9: 63–78.  PDF fulltext

External links

 
Phaegopterina
Moth genera